Physalis acutifolia is a species of flowering plant in the nightshade family known by the common names sharpleaf groundcherry and Wright's ground-cherry. It is native to the southwestern United States from California to Texas, and northern Mexico, where it can be found in many types of habitat, including disturbed areas. It is sometimes a weed when it springs up in agricultural fields, but it is generally not weedy in wild habitat. This is an annual herb producing a branching stem up to a meter tall. The lance-shaped to oval leaves are up to 12 cm long and have edges lined with shallow, smooth teeth. The herbage is coated thinly in hairs appressed flat against the surface. The flowers growing from the leaf axils are round and flat-faced and sometimes over 2 cm wide. They are white to pale yellow with wide, bright yellow centers. The five stamens are each tipped with an anther about 3 mm long. The star-shaped calyx of sepals at the base of the flower enlarges as the fruit develops, becoming an inflated, ribbed lantern-shaped structure about 2 cm long which contains the berry.

References

External links
Jepson Manual Treatment
Photo gallery

acutifolia